Ann Taylor Allen is a professor of German history at the University of Louisville. Allen is the author of four books and more than twenty articles/reviews in peer-reviewed journals. She has a BA from Bryn Mawr College (1965, Magna cum laude), studied at the University of Hamburg, Germany with a Fulbright Fellowship, received an MA in 1967 from Harvard University and earned a PhD from Columbia University in 1974.

Books
Satire and Society in Wilhelmine Germany: Simplicissimus and Kladderadatsch, 1890–1914. Lexington, Kentucky (University Press of Kentucky), 1984.
Feminism and Motherhood in Germany, 1800–1914. New Brunswick, NJ (Rutgers University Press), 1991.
Feminismus und Mütterlichkeit  in Deutschland, 1800–1914. Weinheim (Beltz Verlag), 2000. German version of Feminism and Motherhood, translated by Regine Othmer.
Feminism and Motherhood in Western Europe, 1890–1970: The Maternal Dilemma. New York (Palgrave-Macmillan), 2005.
Women in Twentieth-Century Europe, Houndmills, Basingstoke (Palgrave-Macmillan), 2008.

References

Historians of Germany
Bryn Mawr College alumni
Columbia University alumni
Harvard University alumni
University of Louisville faculty
Living people
University of Hamburg alumni
Place of birth missing (living people)
Year of birth missing (living people)
American women historians
21st-century American historians
21st-century American women writers